National Highway 4 is an important west–east flowing highway of central Burma. It connects the town of Meiktila in the Mandalay Region to Tachileik in Shan State in the east on the border with Thailand ( where it meets Thailand Route 1 ).

Roads in Myanmar